Rouletabille at Krupp's (French: Rouletabille chez Krupp) is a 1917 French thriller novel by the French writer Gaston Leroux. It is the fifth in his series of novels featuring the fictional detective Joseph Rouletabille.

Synopsis
During the First World War, Rouletabille is sent behind enemy lines to investigate the whereabouts of a French scientist who has been kidnapped and forced to work on a new super weapon for the German Empire at the Krupp armaments factory.

References

Bibliography
 Andrea Goulet. Legacies of the Rue Morgue: Science, Space, and Crime Fiction in France. University of Pennsylvania Press, 2016.

1917 French novels
French mystery novels
Novels by Gaston Leroux